Aldersbrook Baptist Church is a Baptist church in the Aldersbrook area of Wanstead in the London Borough of Redbridge. It was formally constituted in 1906, though it had its origins in an 1898 non-denominational mission and a hall on Dover Road in 1902. Its present church building was built beside the hall in 1909, with membership peaking at around 100 people during the 1930s. It was completely rebuilt following bombing in World War II.

External links
http://www.british-history.ac.uk/vch/essex/vol6/pp332-336

Christian organizations established in 1909
Churches in the London Borough of Redbridge
Baptist churches in London
Churches bombed by the Luftwaffe in London